Johann Ostermann (29 April 1911 – 29 March 1968) was an Austrian footballer. He played in one match for the Austria national football team in 1933.

References

External links
 

1911 births
1968 deaths
Austrian footballers
Austria international footballers
Place of birth missing
Association footballers not categorized by position